John Brown Farm, Tannery & Museum, 17620 John Brown Rd., Guys Mills, PA 16327, is a historic archaeological site located in Richmond Township, Crawford County, Pennsylvania. The tannery was built in 1825 by famed abolitionist John Brown (1800–1859), who lived on the site from 1825 to 1835.

The tannery was a major stop on the Underground Railway; Brown helped some 2,500 slaves during this period. There was a hidden, well-ventilated room in the barn for the fugitive slaves. 

In 1874, in "a wonderful state of preservation", it was converted into a cheese factory, and in 1884 it was turned into a steam grist-mill. "The structure is a relic of great historic interest, and is visited by thousands of curiosity and relic seekers, The windows and doors have all been chipped away. The  Brown family have visited their old home several times within the past few years."

A fire destroyed the building in 1907.  On John Brown's birthday, May 9, the site hosts a community celebration, "Spirit of Freedom".

It was added to the National Register of Historic Places in 1978.

The graves of Brown's first wife Dianthe, their four-year-old son Frederick (another son was named Frederick later), and an unnamed newborn son are nearby.

See also
John Brown (abolitionist)#Time in Pennsylvania

References

External links
John Brown Farm, Tannery & Museum - Old Pennsylvania Tourism listing
Photo through West Virginia State Archives

History museums in Pennsylvania
Archaeological sites on the National Register of Historic Places in Pennsylvania
Museums in Crawford County, Pennsylvania
National Register of Historic Places in Crawford County, Pennsylvania
Underground Railroad locations
John Brown sites
Tanneries
Buildings and structures in Crawford County, Pennsylvania
Monuments and memorials to John Brown (abolitionist)